Operation Green Quest was a U.S. interagency investigative unit formed in October 2001 after the September 11 attacks.  Sponsored by the United States Customs Service, it was concerned with the surveillance and interdiction of terrorist financing sources.  It was disbanded in June 2003 pursuant to an agreement between the Department of Homeland Security and the Department of Justice.

Synopsis 
Led by the U.S. Customs Service, and included agents and analysts from the Internal Revenue Service (IRS), the Secret Service, the Bureau of Alcohol, Tobacco and Firearms (ATF), the Federal Bureau of Investigation (FBI), the Office of Foreign Assets Control (OFAC), the Financial Crimes Enforcement Network (FinCEN), the U.S. Postal Inspection Service, and the Naval Criminal Investigative Service. Federal prosecutors from the U.S. Justice Department's Criminal Division also formed an integral part of Operation Green Quest.  The director of Operation Green Quest was a senior special agent from U.S. Customs and the deputy director is a senior special agent from the IRS.

According to Customs, by its fourth month of Operation Green Quest had initiated more than 300 probes into terrorist finances, seizing about $10.3m in smuggled US currency and $4.3m in other assets. Its work resulted in 21 searches, 12 arrests and four indictments.

SAAR network raid 
Its most spectacular operation of was March 20, 2002 raid 19 interrelated business and non-profit entities in Herndon, VA associated with an umbrella corporation known as the SAAR Foundation. No arrests were made and no organizations were shut down, but over 500 boxes of files and computer files were confiscated, filling seven trucks.  Finding no incriminating evidence, much of the confiscated material has been returned.

The raid raised concerns of unfair persecution within the American Muslim community, leading to an April 4, 2002 meeting  in which several notable Muslim figures, including Palestinian-American financier and Republican organizer Talat M. Othman and Islamic Institute head Khaled Saffuri were received by Treasury Secretary Paul O'Neill as representatives of the Muslim-American community to voice complaints about the raid.

Operation Green Quest disbanded

As a result of conflicts between the FBI and the Bureau of Immigration and Customs Enforcement (the successor agency to Customs),  in May 2003 the Attorney General and the Secretary of Homeland Security signed an agreement concerning terrorist financing investigations.  In it, DHS acknowledged that the Department of Justice, through the FBI, was the lead agency in the fight against terrorist financing, and that any terrorist financing investigations would have to be conducted under the auspices of the FBI-led Joint Terrorism Task Force.  DHS also agreed to disband Operation Green Quest by June of that year, and not to start any investigations into terrorism or terrorist financing without the permission of the FBI.

See also 
 International Institute of Islamic Thought, one of the more notable targets of the March 20 raid.
 September 11 attacks

References

External links 
 U.S. Government Press release on Operation Green Quest, reproduced at Yale's Avalon Project
 CBS News, Feds launch 'Operation Green Quest', October 25, 2001
 Customs Service brochure on Operation Green Quest

United States Department of Homeland Security